Brent Ashley Wilkes is the former National Executive Director of the League of United Latin American Citizens.

Personal life
Brent Ashley Wilkes graduated from Dartmouth College in Hanover, NH.  Currently he lives in Virginia with his wife Angela Cross Wilkes and his two sons.

Professional career
As the Executive Director of the largest and oldest Hispanic civil rights organization in the United States, Wilkes worked towards fulfilling the LULAC mission: "to advance the economic condition, educational attainment, political influence, health, housing and civil rights of the Hispanic population of the United States."

References

External links
Official Biography

1966 births
Living people
Dartmouth College alumni